Directory for public worship may refer to:
The Westminster Directory of Public Worship of 1644
The Church of Scotland's Book of Common Order
The Presbyterian Church (U.S.A.)'s Book of Order